Ralph Lumsden Raisbeck (25 December 1898 – 5 April 1958) was an Australian rules footballer who played with Essendon in the Victorian Football League (VFL).

Notes

External links 
		

1898 births
1958 deaths
Australian rules footballers from Melbourne
Essendon Football Club players
People from Cheltenham, Victoria